The SNCF Class BB 66700 is a class of centre cab diesel locomotives rebuilt from the earlier Class BB 66000. They were regeared and had ballast weights added at Nevers depot to enable them to deal with heavier freight wagons. 34 locomotives were converted between 1985 and 1989.

Fleet List

References

66700
B-B locomotives
BB 66700
Standard gauge locomotives of France
Freight locomotives 
Rebuilt locomotives